North Wilmington is an MBTA Commuter Rail station in North Wilmington, Massachusetts. It serves the Haverhill Line, and is located off Middlesex Avenue (Route 62). It has some of the most limited station faculties on the MBTA system - a single short bare platform serving the line's single track at the location, with a small parking lot and single bus shelter for passengers - but is a stop for all trains on the line. North Wilmington station is not accessible.

History

The Boston and Maine Railroad Extension opened on July 1, 1845 from Wilmington Junction to Boston, allowing the Boston and Maine Railroad a route into the city not dependent on the rival Boston and Lowell Railroad. A two-story wooden station was located at North Wilmington on the north side of Middlesex Avenue next to the northbound track, with a small shelter next to the southbound track. The station building was destroyed in a fire caused by a defective chimney on October 26, 1914. A small station building was constructed to replace it.

On June 14, 1959 the section from Reading to Wilmington Junction became freight-only, and Haverhill commuter trains as well as intercity service from New Hampshire and Maine were rerouted over the Wildcat Branch and the lower Lowell Line. The Salem Street stop on the Wildcat Branch opened to replace North Wilmington on the mainline.

The lone remaining Haverhill trip was discontinued in June 1976. During the 1979 energy crisis, service was restored to Haverhill via the pre-1959 route, with several intermediate stops including North Wilmington returned to service. Unlike the stops that had kept service until the 1970s, there was little left at North Wilmington. Like the similarly hastily built stations opened soon after on the Fitchburg Line, North Wilmington received a low asphalt platform and a small parking area, with a bus shelter added for passengers.

Because the platform is close to Route 62, trains block the road when stopped, which causes delays for emergency services. A plan was made in 1992 to move the platform to allow emergency vehicles to drive around the crossing gates when a train was stopped, but the platform was not moved. In 2018, the MBTA agreed to consider near-term changes as well as a later station reconstruction to fix the problem. In January 2021, the MBTA received a $1 million Federal Transit Administration grant to relocate the platform to avoid blocking Route 62, as well as to make the station accessible. This allowed the MBTA to self-fund the project, rather than needing town funding. The new platform will be made from a section of a demolished bridge, similar to Bourne station. By May 2021, work was expected to be complete by the end of 2021.

On January 21, 2022, a motorist was killed when an inbound train struck her auto at the adjacent grade crossing. The initial MBTA investigation indicated that the crossing gates did not function due to an error by a signal technician who was performing preventive maintenance.

References

External links

MBTA - North Wilmington
Station from Middlesex Avenue on Google Maps Street View

MBTA Commuter Rail stations in Middlesex County, Massachusetts
Buildings and structures in Wilmington, Massachusetts
Railway stations in the United States opened in 1979